Julie Therese "Julla" Sæthern (4 December 1901 – 1981) was a Norwegian barrister, feminist and politician.

She was born in Eidskog to Lauritz Sæthern and Martha Nilsson, and graduated as cand.jur. in 1938.

From 1953 to 1959 she chaired the Norwegian National Women's Council.

She was decorated Knight, First Class of the Order of St. Olav in 1972.

References

1901 births
1981 deaths
Norwegian women lawyers
Norwegian feminists
Norwegian politicians
People from Eidskog
20th-century Norwegian lawyers